Cascade Beverages is a range of non-alcoholic mixers and adult soft drinks that are made and sold in Australia. Established in 1886 as part of the Cascade Brewery in Tasmania, the range became part of the Coca-Cola Amatil business in 2013 and continues to be made in Australia with majority Australian ingredients.

Products

Below is a listing of the products currently on offer:

 Fruit Syrups - range includes Raspberry, made with crushed raspberries from Tasmania and Ultra-C Blackcurrant Syrup, made from Tasmanian grown blackcurrants from Westerway Farms .
 Quality Mixers - range includes Tonic Water, Dry Ginger Ale, Soda Water & Lime, Soda Water & Lemon, and regular Soda Water
 Adult Sparkling Flavours - range includes Ginger Beer, Lemon Lime & Bitters and Sarsaparilla 
 Cordials - Lemon, Raspberry, Lime 

These flavours are available in 330mL glass in Cafes, Restaurants and On Premise Licensed outlets and 4x200mL can in supermarkets.  Dry Ginger Ale and Tonic Water are also available 'on tap' in over 2,000 pubs, clubs and bars across Australia.

See also

 List of brand name soft drinks products
 List of soft drink flavors
 List of soft drinks by country

References

External links
 

Non-alcoholic drinks
Drink companies of Australia
Australian companies established in 1886
Food and drink companies established in 1886